Pauline Marthea Georgine Bergstrøm Thomsen (17 July 1858 – 16 April 1931) was a Danish painter and art teacher.

Biography
Born on 17 July 1858 in Roskilde, Pauline Thomsen was the daughter of the lecturer Christen Thomsen (1822–1874) and Pauline Mathea Georgine Bergstrøm (1831–1896). From 1877 to 1880 Thomsen attended Vilhelm Kyhn's art school in Copenhagen as the Academy did not admit women until 1888. She adopted his Romantic approach in the landscapes she painted first in Zealand and later together with Kyhn's former students in the area around Ry and Himmelbjerget in Jutland. Her landscapes seldom include figures but often have striking groups of trees. Like Kyhn, she gave the sky and cloud formations an important place in her paintings. Her few portraits are mainly pen-and-ink or charcoal drawings. She exhibited at Charlottenborg Spring Exhibition from 1885 to 1931 and at Kunstnernes Efterårsudstilling in 1905 and 1907. In 1895 she exhibited in Chicago and in 1900 in Paris at the World Exhibition.

Thomsen died on 16 April 1931 in Ry near Skanderborg in Jutland.

References

1858 births
1931 deaths
19th-century Danish painters
20th-century Danish painters
Danish women artists
People from Roskilde
20th-century Danish women artists
20th-century Danish artists
19th-century Danish women artists